John Crocker Sherwin (February 8, 1838 – January 1, 1904) was a U.S. Representative from Illinois.

Biography
Born in Gouverneur, St. Lawrence County, New York, Sherwin was educated in the common schools, Gouverneur Wesleyan Seminary in New York, and Lombard College, Galesburg, Illinois, where he studied law.
He was admitted to the bar and practiced.
County clerk of Kane County, Illinois.
He served as city attorney of Aurora, Illinois.
Enlisted in the Union Army during the Civil War in the Company H, Eighty-ninth Regiment, Illinois Volunteer Infantry, and served until the close of the war. He became a sergeant.

Sherwin was elected as a Republican to the Forty-sixth and Forty-seventh Congresses (March 4, 1879 – March 3, 1883). He was not a candidate for renomination in 1882. He resumed the practice of law. He died at Benton Harbor, Michigan, January 1, 1904. He was interred in Spring Lake Cemetery, Aurora, Illinois.

References

External links
 

1838 births
1904 deaths
People from Aurora, Illinois
Lombard College alumni
Union Army non-commissioned officers
Republican Party members of the United States House of Representatives from Illinois
19th-century American politicians